Karoophasma is a genus of insects in the family Mantophasmatidae. It contains 2 species that are endemic to western South Africa.

Species
These species belong to the genus Karoophasma:

 Karoophasma biedouwense Klass, Picker, Damgaard, van Noort & Tojo, 2003
Karoophasma biedouwensis Klass, Picker, Damgaard, van Noort & Tojo, 2003
 Karoophasma botterkloofense Klass, Picker, Damgaard, van Noort & Tojo, 2003
Karoophasma botterkloofensis Klass Picker Damgaard van Noort & Tojo 2003

References

Mantophasmatidae
Insects of South Africa
Endemic fauna of South Africa